Enneapterygius elaine is a species of triplefin blenny in the genus Enneapterygius. It was described by Wouter Holleman in 2005. It is a tropical blenny known from Rodrigues Island, in the western Indian Ocean. Male Enneapterygius elaine can reach a maximum length of 2.3 centimetres. The specific name honours Elaine Heemstra of the Institute for Aquatic Biodiversity in Grahamstown who provided illustrations of reef fish for Holleman, including some in the paper in which this species was described.

References

External links
 Enneapterygius elaine at www.fishwise.co.za.
 Enneapterygius elaine at Encyclopedia of Life
 Enneapterygius elaine at World Register of Marine Species
 Enneapterygius elaine at www.zipcodezoo.com

elaine
Taxa named by Wouter Holleman
Fish described in 2005
Fish of the Indian Ocean
Endemic fauna of Mauritius